The Marble Arch, also Arch of the Philaeni, formerly known in Libya as El Gaus (i.e. "The Arch"), was a monument in Libya built during the days of Italian colonization. The arch marked the border between Tripolitania and Cyrenaica, and was located on the Via Balbia (actual Libyan Coastal Highway) near Ra's Lanuf.

History 
The arch was designed by architect Florestano Di Fausto in response to a request by the Italian Governor-General Italo Balbo. It was unveiled on 16 March 1937 in a lavish night ceremony attended by Benito Mussolini.

 

The landmark was named after the legendary Philaeni brothers of Carthage, who chose to be buried alive on that spot in order to gain this border for their home town. It bore two giant bronze statues of the brothers, represented as buried alive, surmounted by a stylised altar, mocking one of the disappeared Arae. The landmark was decorated by basreliefs which illustrated the legend.

On the arch's frontispiece was carved a Latin inscription taken from Horace's Carmen Saeculare. It read:

King Idris I of Libya had the Latin inscription translated into Arabic. The arch was reproduced in postcards and Italian Africa lottery tickets and soon became one of the symbols of Italian Libya and of the works done by the Italian Libyan colonists. 

Revolutionary leader Muammar Gaddafi, who considered the landmark as a sign of the Italian domination of Libya, demolished the arch using dynamite in 1973. Another possible reason for this demolition is that the arch was a symbol of separation between two parts of Libya, Tripolitania and Cyrenaica.

A water tower inspired by the monument was built in 1942 in the Italian town Riozzo, and survives to the present.

See also
 Italian Libya
 Litoranea Balbo

Notes

References 
 Philip Kenrick. Tripolitania: Libya Archaeological Guides. Silphium Press, London, 2009. 224 pages. pp. 152–157.
 
 
 
George MacDonald Fraser, McAuslan in the Rough, Barrie & Jenkins, Ltd., 1974. pp. 16-20.

External links

 World war II talk about the Marble Arch 
 L'arco dei Fileni de Mussolini (in French)
 Close-up photo taken in the 1940s

Monuments and memorials in Libya
Italian Libya
Italian fascist architecture
Triumphal arches
History of Tripolitania
Italian Cyrenaica
Buildings and structures completed in 1937
Buildings and structures demolished in 1973